Mike Dalton may refer to:

Michael Dalton (priest) (1902–2009), Canadian military chaplain
Mike Dalton (baseball) (born 1963), Major League Baseball pitcher with the Detroit Tigers
Mike Dalton (wrestler), former ring name of Matt Clement, Canadian wrestler

See also
Michael Dalton (disambiguation)